Rudolfovo is a small settlement in hills northeast of Begunje in the Municipality of Cerknica in the Inner Carniola region of Slovenia.

References

External links

Rudolfovo on Geopedia

Populated places in the Municipality of Cerknica